On 4 September 2014, 82-year-old Palmira Silva was beheaded in her back garden in Edmonton, London, by 25-year-old Nicholas Salvador, who was on a rampage. Friends of Salvador had recently noticed odd behaviour by him, including drug and alcohol abuse and an obsession with videos of beheadings.

Psychiatrists found evidence that Salvador had paranoid schizophrenia. On 23 June 2015, he was found not guilty of murder on basis of insanity, and was detained indefinitely in a psychiatric hospital.

Victim
Palmira Silva, aged 82, emigrated to London in the 1950s from Southern Italy with her husband Domenico, and was a widow. She was the proprietor of a café, and a great-grandmother with two children, six grandchildren and a great-grandchild. Her daughter, Celestina, claimed that her mother wished to stay in Edmonton although "the area was changing".

Silva's funeral was held on 24 September. Her granddaughter Christina ran the 2015 London Marathon to raise money for Victim Support.

Perpetrator

Nicholas Salvador, aged 25 at the time of the killing, was staying with friends three doors from Silva's house. He is an only child who came to the United Kingdom from Nigeria with his parents in his early teenage years. After finishing a college course in Media, he had spells as manual labourer, losing his job as a billboard paster three days before the killing due to concerns surrounding his behaviour. He was active in cage fighting, and known as "Fat Nick" for his stature.

Acquaintances said that he had issues with drug and alcohol abuse, and was a drug dealer. His friends told the police that Salvador used cocaine and skunk cannabis, and would drink a bottle of whisky or brandy per day. Contacts also revealed that he was obsessed with watching videos of beheadings and searching the Internet for Jihadist material. He was also obsessed with the idea of shapeshifters.

Religion controversy
According to different witnesses, Salvador is either from a Muslim background, or a convert to the religion five years beforehand. His former employer, who claimed Salvador to be a convert, said that he never discussed religion or politics. According to others, Salvador converted from Islam to Buddhism in 2014.

Public speculation linked the killing to the recent beheadings of two American journalists by the Islamic State of Iraq and the Levant. The day following the killing, tabloid The Sun ran the front-page headline "'Muslim convert' beheads woman in garden", which received a mixed reception from the public due to the conflicting accounts of Salvador's beliefs or motive. Head of PR Dylan Sharpe defended his newspaper's printing of the headline, on the basis that other publications were also reporting on the murder with similar headlines.

Attack
Two hours before the killing, Salvador ate at a café and left without paying. A staff member, who followed him out and successfully got him to pay, noted that "he seemed a bit depressed or upset about something".

Shirtless, and armed with a knife and a broom handle, Salvador began to rampage, knocking down his neighbours' fences and beheading two cats. He broke into Silva's garden and she walked up to him, then he beheaded her. Police evacuated children in the area, and an officer gave the order "He's agitated and lethal... he needs taking out". After the police cornered Salvador, they struggled to arrest him, with one officer being assaulted by him. He had to be tasered six times. Salvador's rampage lasted for 45 minutes.

Trial
Following Salvador's arrest, the Metropolitan Police reacted to speculation by stating that there were no links between his rampage and terrorism. He was sent to Broadmoor Hospital, where psychiatrists found him to have paranoid schizophrenia. Salvador believed Silva to be a reincarnation of Adolf Hitler or a shapeshifting demon, and admitted to her killing.

He was tried at the Old Bailey, where a 14-minute recording of his rampage was shown. On medical reports, he was found not guilty of murder by reason of insanity, but ordered to remain indefinitely in Broadmoor. The judge, Recorder of London Nicholas Hilliard, concluded:

References

2014 crimes in the United Kingdom
2014 in London
2010s trials
Attacks in the United Kingdom in 2014
2010s crimes in London
Deaths by decapitation
Deaths by stabbing in London
Deaths by person in London
Edmonton, London
Italian people murdered abroad
History of mental health in the United Kingdom
Murder in London
People with schizophrenia
September 2014 crimes in Europe
September 2014 events in the United Kingdom
Stabbing attacks in 2014
Stabbing attacks in England
Trials in London